Yal Devi is a major express train in Sri Lanka.  Operated by Sri Lanka Railways, the Yal Devi connects Colombo, the nation's commercial hub, with the northern cities of Jaffna and Kankesanturai.  From 1990 up to 2015, the service had to terminate at intermediate stations, due to the Sri Lankan civil war.  The Northern Line was rebuilt and returned to Jaffna Railway Station by October 2014 and  Kankesanturai by January 2015.

Services 
The Yal Devi offers Three classes of travel.
1st class observation saloon
2nd class.
3rd class typically gets very crowded and carries only basic facilities.

History 
Though trains had been operating on the Northern Line since the beginning of the twentieth century, the services were not named.  In the 1950s named trains were established on the major lines.  The Yal Devi, as a named-express train, was established to connect Colombo, Jaffna, and Kankesanturai, as commissioned by B. D. Rampala, the railways' then-general manager.

In 1990, the Yal Devi stopped operating past Vavuniya because of the declining security condition.

After the war ended in 2009, work started to rebuild the track and restore the Yal Devi service to Kankesanturai, under the Uthuru Mithuru Project.  Initially, the service was extended to Thandikulam, With effect from 13 October 2014 it has been begun services up to newly rebuilt Jaffna railway station after twenty four years. The restoration of northern railway tracks project has been funded by a line of credit provided by the Government of India.

The Yal Devi service was ceremoniously declared open by President Mahinda Rajapaksa 13 October 2014.

Route 
The Yal Devi follows Sri Lanka Railways' Northern Line. The train begins its northbound journey at Colombo Fort. At Polgahawela, the train branches off the Main Line, moving towards Kankesanturai. It passes Kurunegala, the capital of North Western Province, before continuing to the historic cultural and religious center of Anuradhapura, the island's ancient capital around the 4th century BCE and home to many sites of religious and archaeological interest. After passing Vavuniya it reaches Omanthai. As of September 2013 the service the train terminated at Kilinochchi. The train used to continue onwards to Jaffna. Jaffna is the main cultural centre of the north of Sri Lanka. From here the Northern Line extended to Kankesanturai, a port city, with the Yal Devi train from Colombo terminating here.  The entire re-construction of the Northern Line (from Omanthai to Kankesanthurai – 146 km)  was completed during the latter half of 2014, and it was finally opened to public on 3 January 2015.

See also 
Sri Lanka Railways
List of named passenger trains of Sri Lanka

References

External links 
 Uthuru Mithuru: Rebuilding the Yal Devi Friendship Track

Named passenger trains of Sri Lanka
Rail transport in Northern Province, Sri Lanka